Rubi Valley is a rural municipality located within the Dhading District of the Bagmati Province of Nepal. The rural municipality spans , with a total population of 9,565 according to a 2011 Nepal census.

On March 10, 2017, the Government of Nepal restructured the local level bodies into 753 new local level structures. The previous Lapa, Sirtung, and Tipling VDCs were merged to form Rubi Valley. Rubi Valley is divided into 6 wards, with Sirtung declared the administrative center of the rural municipality.

Demographics
At the time of the 2011 Nepal census, Rubi Valley Rural Municipality had a population of 9,562. Of these, 85.4% spoke Tamang, 14.2% Nepali, 0.2% Gurung and 0.3% other languages as their first language.

In terms of ethnicity/caste, 74.1% were Tamang, 12.4% Ghale, 7.9% Gurung, 3.5% Kami, 0.7% Damai/Dholi, 0.5% other Dalit, 0.4% Hill Brahmin, 0.1% Chhetri and 0.3% others.

In terms of religion, 53.3% were Buddhist, 39.1% Christian, 7.4% Hindu and 0.1% others.

In terms of literacy, 45.3% could both read and write, 4.2% could read but not write and 50.4% could neither read nor write.

References

External links
Official website of the rural municipality

Rural municipalities in Dhading District
Rural municipalities of Nepal established in 2017